Jadwiga Wysoczanská-Štrosová (24 May 1927 – 31 March 2021) was a Czech operatic soprano. She was a soloist of the National Theatre in Prague.

Life 
Born Jadwiga Wysoczanská in Prague, she became a soloist at the National Theatre in 1960, where she performed the title roles of Smetana's Libuše, Dvořák's Rusalka, Verdi's Aida, and leading roles such as Donna Anna in Mozart's Don Giovanni and Tatiana in Tchaikovsky's Eugene Onegin. She took part in a 1961 recording of Rusalka, as Woodsprite I.

Wysoczanská died in Prague on 31 March 2021, aged 93.

References

External links
 Jadwiga Wysoczanská (in Czech) National Theatre Prague

20th-century Czech women opera singers
1927 births
2021 deaths
Artists from Prague